The Bethune–Cookman Wildcats men's basketball team represents Bethune–Cookman University in the sport of basketball. The Wildcats compete in the NCAA Division I and the Southwestern Athletic Conference (SWAC). They play their home games in Moore Gymnasium on campus in Daytona Beach, Florida. They are coached by former NBA player and Sacramento Kings coach Reggie Theus. The team has been playing since 1930, having joined Division I along with the rest of the conference in 1980.

The Wildcats are one of 35 eligible Division I programs to have never appeared in the NCAA Division I men's basketball tournament.

Team History

Pre-Division I (1930–1979) 
For the first 50 years of their program, the Bethune–Cookman Wildcats men's basketball team competed in the NCAA Division II. Through this era, they had 8 different coaches. The most notable coach from this era was former Bethune-Cookman and Pittsburgh Steelers player Jack "Cy" McClairen. Some accomplishments during this era include qualifying for the NIBT tournament twice, the NAIA tournament once, and the NCAA Division II tournament three times. All of these post-season runs ended in defeat for Bethune-Cookman.

Division I Era (1980–Present Day) 
After competing in NCAA Division II for 50 years, the team was invited to play in the NCAA Division I. In 2021, Bethune-Cookman accepted an invitation to join the Southwestern Athletic Conference (SWAC). Originally, the team played in the Mid-Eastern Athletic Conference (MEAC). During this time, the only tournament the Wildcats have made is the NIT tournament. Though they now play in the NCAA Division I, they have never made a tournament appearance.

Results by season in Division I (1980–2021)

Postseason results

NCAA Division II tournament results
The Wildcats have appeared in the NCAA Division II Tournament three times. Their combined record is 0–6.

NAIA tournament results
The Wildcats have appeared in the NAIA Tournament one time. Their record is 0–1.

NIT results
The Wildcats have appeared in one National Invitation Tournament (NIT). Their record is 0–1.

Notable players

 Kevin Bradshaw, NCAA basketball record-holder for points in a single game, player in the Israeli Basketball Premier League
 John Chaney, 41st Winningest Men's Basketball Coach 
 Cy McClairen, Former Player, Bethune-Cookman's Winningest Head Coach, and Athletic Director.
Carl Fuller, Drafted into the ABA in the 7th round by the St. Louis Hawks.
Johnny Allen, Drafted into the ABA in the 4th round by the San Diego Rockets.
Sam Barber, Drafted into the ABA in the 16th round by the Boston Celtics.

References

External links
Team website